The South Park Football Club was a foundation club of the South Australian Football Association (later renamed the SANFL) which competed in the inaugural 1877 SAFA season.

The Football Club was formed following a meeting called by the Secretary of South Park Cricket Club at the Prince Albert Hotel, Wright Street, Adelaide on Tuesday 10 April 1877.

South Park's Captain for the 1877 Season was Mr. J. H. Sinclair.

Team Members for 1879 Season - John Creswell (Secretary), Alwin Murr Pettinger (Captain), Morton Beach Ive (Vice-Captain), E. Cotching,A. Clarke,F. Dobbs,E.B. Colton,A.H. Dick,C. Hall, James Thornhill Darwent, G.E. Durant, John James Palmer, R. Binney, Jack Hall, J.V. Smith, D. Harrold, William James Dishley, C. Godfrey, Harry Ewer, Fred Stacey, A. Wilson, Joseph Robert George Adams, William Rousenvell, F. Taylor. They had a total of 104 members. Part of their uniform included a striped hat and tall lace up boots.

1880 Season - Patron Mr James Hamilton Parr,  President Superintendent Peterswald, Messrs. W. B. Rounsevell, M.P., W.K.Simms, M.P. and W. Sketheway, vice-presidents.

The club played a game against the VFA Champions Geelong Football Club in the 1884 Season losing 2 goals 6 behinds to 7 goals 12 behinds.

At the end of the 1884 season which had seen it finish fourth (out of five) and with just one win and one draw from 12 games (same as North Adelaide/Victorian) it only avoided the wooden spoon by the number of goals scored. The club forfeited its final two games of the season against Port Adelaide and Norwood.

Following the Annual General Meeting held at Hamburg Hotel on Wednesday 18 March 1885 in which the last minutes were read and confirmed and the balance sheet reported showing a small deficit a motion was passed to resign from the SAFA and disband. It was reported that great regret was expressed by members present, a vote of thanks in recognition of the efforts for the officers was taken and it was decided by those present to give their support for the newly amalgamated "Adelaiders".

This influx of fresh talent was sufficient to propel South Adelaide, who had finished third in 1884, to the 1885 premiership.

References

Australian rules football clubs in South Australia
Former South Australian National Football League clubs